James Conklin (June 12, 1831 – February 27, 1899) was mayor of Madison, Wisconsin.

Biography
Conklin was born on June 12, 1831 in Burlington, Vermont. He married Mary Egan. Conklin died in Madison on February 27, 1899.

Career
Conklin was twice Mayor. First, from 1881 to 1884, and second, from 1887 to 1888. He also served on the Madison Board of Education, the Madison Common Council, and the Wisconsin State Senate.

References

1831 births
1899 deaths
Politicians from Burlington, Vermont
Mayors of Madison, Wisconsin
Wisconsin city council members
Wisconsin state senators
19th-century American politicians